The Standing Committee on Labour and Social Affairs is a standing committee of the Parliament of Norway. It is responsible for areas related to the labour market, the working environment, benefits, pensions and disability policy. It corresponds to the Ministry of Labour and Social Inclusion. The committee has 13 members and is chaired by Arve Kambe of the Conservative Party.

Members 2013–17

References

Standing committees of the Storting